Severny Urban Settlement is the name of several municipal formations in Russia.

Severny Urban Settlement, a municipal formation which the settlement of Severny in Belgorodsky District of Belgorod Oblast is incorporated as
Severny Urban Settlement, a municipal formation which the Work Settlement of Severny in Taldomsky District of Moscow Oblast is incorporated as

See also
Severny (disambiguation)

References

Notes

Sources

